Károly Eisenkrammer (born 4 January 1969) is a Hungarian former cyclist. He competed in the individual road race at the 1992 Summer Olympics.

References

1969 births
Living people
Hungarian male cyclists
Olympic cyclists of Hungary
Cyclists at the 1992 Summer Olympics
Cyclists from Budapest